Appanoose County is a county in the U.S. state of Iowa. As of the 2020 census, the population was 12,317. Its county seat is Centerville.

History 

Appanoose County was formed on February 17, 1843, from open territory.  It was named for the Meskwaki Chief Appanoose, who did not engage in war against Black Hawk, advocating peace.  The present county seat was formerly called Chaldea, and was later renamed to Senterville in honor of Congressman William Tandy Senter of Tennessee.  In April 1848, the courthouse, constructed at the expense of $160, was put into use and served as such until 1857.  The second courthouse was opened in 1864, and was burned down to the first floor during an explosive Fourth of July fireworks demonstration.  The third courthouse was dedicated on May 21, 1903, and remains in use.

In the summer of 1832 a company of cavalry set out from Davenport on a reconnaissance which extended as far west as Fort Leavenworth. They passed through what would become Appanoose County in a nearly southwest direction, passing near the present city of Moulton, camping overnight at a spring southwest of Cincinnati, and leaving the area and crossing into Missouri near the southwest corner of Pleasant Township.  Early settlers in search of claims found two trails.  The route taken by the cavalrymen and another with a general north–south direction, passing through Washington Township, and known as the bee trace and used in the summer by honey collectors. A post office in Washington Township was called Beetrace.  The Beetrace post office was discontinued on March 1, 1886.  This may have been originally an Indian trail. The first settlers say that it was a tolerably well-defined wagon road as far north as the Beetrace post office and that it could be followed easily into Taylor Township.  Another "bee-trace" ran from Missouri diagonally through Davis County and terminated near Unionville.

Geography
Rathbun Reservoir, created by damming the Chariton River, is its main physical feature.

Major highways
 Iowa Highway 2
 Iowa Highway 5
 Iowa Highway 202

Adjacent counties
 Monroe County  (north)
 Wapello County  (northeast)
 Lucas County  (northwest)
 Davis County  (east)
 Schuyler County, Missouri  (southeast)
 Putnam County, Missouri  (southwest)
 Wayne County  (west)

Demographics

2020 census
There were 6,306 housing units of which 5,320 were occupied.

2010 census
There were 6,633 housing units, of which 5,627 were occupied.

2000 census

At the 2000 census there were 13,721 people, 5,779 households, and 3,802 families in the county.  The population density was 28 people per square mile (11/km2).  There were 6,697 housing units at an average density of 14 per square mile (5/km2).  The racial makeup of the county was 98.16% White, 0.42% Black or African American, 0.17% Native American, 0.26% Asian, 0.01% Pacific Islander, 0.27% from other races, and 0.71% from two or more races.  0.98%. were Hispanic or Latino of any race.

Of the 5,779 households 28.40% had children under the age of 18 living with them, 53.10% were married couples living together, 8.80% had a female householder with no husband present, and 34.20% were non-families. 29.90% of households were one person and 15.40% were one person aged 65 or older.  The average household size was 2.34 and the average family size was 2.89.

23.70% of the people are under the age of 18, 7.80% from 18 to 24, 25.10% from 25 to 44, 23.50% from 45 to 64, and 20.00% 65 or older.  The median age was 41 years. For every 100 females there were 91.50 males.  For every 100 females age 18 and over, there were 89.50 males.

The median household income was $28,612 and the median family income  was $35,980. Males had a median income of $27,449 versus $20,452 for females. The per capita income for the county was $14,644.  About 10.10% of families and 14.50% of the population were below the poverty line, including 16.00% of those under age 18 and 14.10% of those age 65 or over.

Communities

Cities

Centerville
Cincinnati
Exline
Moravia
Moulton
Mystic
Numa
Plano
Rathbun
Udell
Unionville

Townships
Appanoose County is divided into seventeen townships:

 Bellair
 Caldwell
 Chariton
 Douglas
 Franklin
 Independence
 Johns
 Lincoln
 Pleasant
 Sharon
 Taylor
 Udell
 Union
 Vermillion
 Walnut
 Washington
 Wells

Population ranking
The population ranking of the following table is based on the 2020 census of Appanoose County.

† county seat

Politics

See also

National Register of Historic Places listings in Appanoose County, Iowa
The Appanoose County Courthouse Article

References

External links

County website
Appanoose Economic Development Corporation
Appanoose County Sheriff's Office

 
Iowa placenames of Native American origin
1843 establishments in Iowa Territory
Populated places established in 1843